The 2011 UT Martin Skyhawks football team represented the University of Tennessee at Martin as a member of the Ohio Valley Conference (OVC) during the 2011 NCAA Division I FCS football season. Led by sixth-year head coach Jason Simpson, the Skyhawks compiled an overall record of 5–6 with a mark of 4–4 in conference play, tying for fifth place in the OVC. UT Martin played home games at Graham Stadium in Martin, Tennessee.

Schedule

References

UT Martin
UT Martin Skyhawks football seasons
UT Martin Skyhawks football